Herndon is an unincorporated community in Saline County, in the U.S. state of Missouri.

History
Herndon was platted in 1874, and named after Edward S. Herndon, an early settler. A post office called Herndon was established in 1873, and remained in operation until 1907.

References

Unincorporated communities in Saline County, Missouri
Unincorporated communities in Missouri